Charles Russell may refer to:

Entertainment
 Charles Marion Russell (1864–1926), artist of the American West
 Charles Russell (actor) (1918–1985), American actor
 Charles Ellsworth Russell, jazz clarinetist, better known as Pee Wee Russell

Politics and law

U.K.
 Charles Russell (1786–1856), British Member of Parliament for Reading
 Lord Charles Russell (1807–1894), British soldier and MP
 Sir Charles Russell, 3rd Baronet (1826–1883), English Conservative politician and recipient of the Victoria Cross
 Charles Russell, Baron Russell of Killowen (1832–1900), British statesman
 Sir Charles Russell, 1st Baronet (1863–1928), British solicitor
 Charles Ritchie Russell, Baron Russell of Killowen (1908–1986), British judge and law lord

U.S.
 Charles Thaddeus Russell (1875–1952), African-American architect from Richmond, Virginia
 Charles Theodore Russell (1815–1896), Massachusetts legislator and mayor of Cambridge, Massachusetts
 Charles Wells Russell (1818–1867), Virginia lawyer and politician; Confederate delegate during the American Civil War
 Charles Wells Russell, Jr. (1856–1927), American diplomat
 Charles H. Russell (Brooklyn) (1845–1912), American lawyer and politician from New York
 Charles Addison Russell (1852–1902), U.S. Representative from Connecticut
 Charles E. Russell (1868–1960), New York politician and judge
 Charles H. Russell (1903–1989), Governor of Nevada
 Charles S. Russell (born 1926), judge in the U.S. state of Virginia

Other politicians
 Charles Russell (Newfoundland journalist) (1877–1937), Newfoundland journalist and politician
 Charles Russell (Australian politician) (1907–1977), Australian politician
 Charles Homer Russell, Canadian political candidate

Sports
 Charles Russell (rugby) (1884–1957), Australian dual-code rugby footballer
 Jack Russell (cricketer, born 1887) (Charles Albert George Russell, 1887–1961), English cricketer
 Charles Russell (cricketer, born 1814) (1814–1859), English cricketer and descendant of Oliver Cromwell

Other
 Charles E. B. Russell (1866–1917), author and early figure in the history of youth work
 Charles William Russell (1812–1880), Irish Roman Catholic clergyman and scholar
 Charles Sawyer Russell (1831–1866), American Civil War general
 Charles L. Russell (1844–1910), U.S. Army corporal and Medal of Honor recipient
 Charles Taze Russell (1852–1916), American evangelist
 Charles Edward Russell (1860–1941), American muckraking journalist, author, and activist
 Charles Handy Russell, American merchant and banker 
 Colonel Charles Michael Russell, fictional character of William Haggard

See also
 Charlie Russell (disambiguation)
 Chuck Russell (born 1958), American film director
 Charles M. Russell National Wildlife Refuge, a park in Montana
 Russell (surname)